Elections to South Ribble Borough Council were held on 7 May 1987. The whole council was up for election and the Conservative Party retained its majority. The elections were the first to be held under the new boundaries laid out in March 1987.

Election result

|}

Ward Results

References
 The Elections Centre, South Ribble Borough Council Election Results (PDF)

1987 English local elections
1987
1980s in Lancashire